Serbia was represented by 12 athletes (6 men and 6 women) at the 2010 European Athletics Championships held in  Barcelona, Spain, from 27 July to 1 August 2010.

Participants

Results

References 
Participants list

Nations at the 2010 European Athletics Championships
2010
European Athletics Championships